The Scottish Legal Aid Board (SLAB) is an executive non-departmental public body of the Scottish Government, responsible for managing legal aid. It was established in April 1987, under the Legal Aid (Scotland) Act 1986, taking over functions previously exercised by the Law Society.

In 2006 it had an annual budget of approximately £164 million.

History
Providing free legal assistance in Scotland is based on the Poor's Roll of 1424:
"and gif there bee onie pure creature, for faulte of cunning, or expenses, that cannot, nor may not follow his cause, the King for the love of GOD, sall ordain the judge to purwey and get a leill and a wise Advocate, to follow sik pure creatures causes"

This was reinforced by a 1587 Act of the Scots Parliament:
"quhatsumever lieges of this Realme accused of treason, or for quatsumever crime... full libertie to provide himselfe of Advocates and Praeloquutoures, in competent numbers to defend his life, honour and land, against quhatsumever accusation".

See also
Scottish public bodies
Public Defender Solicitor Office, funded by SLAB

References

External links
 
 The history of legal aid in Scotland

1987 in law
1987 establishments in Scotland
Government agencies established in 1987
Legal aid
Legal Aid Board
 
Organisations based in Edinburgh
Legal organisations based in Scotland